Grasulf II, son of Duke Gisulf I, was the Duke of Friuli after the assassination of his nephews, Tasso and Kakko, in Oderzo in 616 or 617. His other nephews, Radoald and Grimoald, left Friuli for the Duchy of Benevento because they did not wish to live under Grasulf. Nothing more is known about Grasulf and the date of his death is uncertain. He died at Cividale.

Notes

Sources
Paul the Deacon. Historia Langobardorum. Available at Northvegr.

Year of birth missing
651 deaths
Dukes of Friuli
7th-century Lombard people
7th-century rulers in Europe